Psychroflexus aestuariivivens  is a Gram-negative and aerobic bacteria from the genus of Psychroflexus which has been isolated from tidal flat sediments from the Yellow Sea Korea.

References

External links
Type strain of Psychroflexus aestuariivivens at BacDive -  the Bacterial Diversity Metadatabase

Flavobacteria
Bacteria described in 2016